Kazakhstan is competing at the 2013 Summer Universiade in Kazan, Russia from 6 July to 17 July 2013. 169 athletes are a part of the Kazakh team.

Kazakhstan has won 30 medals, including 3 gold medals.

References

Nations at the 2013 Summer Universiade
2013